The 2008 Rose Bowl Game presented by Citi, the 94th Rose Bowl Game, played on January 1, 2008 at the Rose Bowl Stadium in Pasadena, California, was a college football bowl game. The contest was televised on ABC, the 20th straight year the network aired the Rose Bowl, starting at 4:30pm EST. The game's main sponsor was Citi.

The 2008 Rose Bowl featured the 7th-ranked USC Trojans hosting the 13th-ranked Illinois Fighting Illini. As with the previous year's game, the contest was a semi-traditional Rose Bowl in that while it was a Big Ten versus Pac-10 matchup, the Big Ten representative was an at-large team because the conference champion, Ohio State, which lost to Illinois earlier in the season, was selected to play in the BCS National Championship Game.

USC was making its third straight appearance in the Rose Bowl, while Illinois had not played in the game since 1984. Though Illinois won the Big Ten Conference title in 2001, the then-rotating BCS title game moved them to the Sugar Bowl.

Game summary
USC took an early 21–0 lead, including a touchdown pass by backup quarterback Garrett Green on a trick play. Illinois verged on closing to 21–10 midway through the third quarter, but receiver Jacob Willis fumbled into the end zone after a catch and Trojans linebacker Brian Cushing recovered for a touchback. USC converted that miscue into a touchdown and then cornerback Cary Harris intercepted Illinois quarterback Juice Williams's pass on the first play of the ensuing possession. Five plays later, Trojans freshman Joe McKnight scored on a 6-yard run, making the score 35–10.  USC gained a Rose Bowl-record 633 yards of offense in defeating Illinois 49–17.

Scoring summary

Game records

Most TD passes career, Rose Bowl History- 7, John David Booty

References

Rose Bowl
Rose Bowl Game
Illinois Fighting Illini football bowl games
USC Trojans football bowl games
Rose Bowl
January 2008 sports events in the United States
21st century in Pasadena, California